Dietmar I, also Theotmar I, was archbishop of Salzburg from 874 to 907. He died fighting against the Hungarians at Brezalauspurc on July 4, 907.

Footnotes

References 

9th-century bishops in Bavaria
907 deaths